The 2012–13 Penn Quakers men's basketball team represented the University of Pennsylvania during the 2011–12 NCAA Division I men's basketball season. The Quakers, led by fourth year head coach Jerome Allen, played their home games at The Palestra and were members of the Ivy League. They finished the season 9–22, 6–8 in Ivy League play to finish in fifth place.

Roster

Schedule

|-
!colspan=9| Regular Season

References

Penn Quakers men's basketball seasons
Penn
Penn Quakers men's basketball team
Penn Quakers men's basketball team